A Small Learning Community (SLC), also referred to as a School-Within-A-School, is a school organizational model that is an increasingly common form of learning environment in American secondary schools to subdivide large school populations into smaller, autonomous groups of students and teachers.  SLCs can also be physical learning spaces.

The primary purpose of restructuring secondary schools into SLCs is to create a more personalized learning environment to better meet the needs of students. Each community will often share the same teachers and student members from grade to grade. Teachers in these units usually have common planning time to allow them to develop interdisciplinary projects and keep up with the progress of their shared students.

Types
SLCs can take several forms.

 Theme-Based Smaller Learning Communities or Focus Schools are usually formed around a specific curricular theme.  Examples might include "Success Academy" or "Humanities".
 Houses may be themed or non-themed or separated by grade levels.
 Career Academies are generally a three- or four-year structure developed around a career theme or Career Clusters.  Characterized by career-related electives and integration of career theme across entire academic curriculum.
 Freshman Academies are structure designed to support 9th grade students as they transition into high school.
 Magnet Schools are a career-themed SLC that includes accelerated course-work for Gifted & Talented students.

Courses 
Core courses include:

 SLC Portfolio

 SLC Honors World History I: Prehistory - 1500
 SLC Honors World History II: 1500 - Present
 SLC Honors United States History (or SLC Honors European History)

 SLC Honors Geometry
 SLC Honors Algebra II
 SLC Honors Statistics
 SLC Honors Biology: Ecological & Molecular (E/M)
 SLC Honors Chemistry
 SLC Honors Environmental Science: Practical & Experimental (P/E)
 SLC Heart of Advanced Science (In some schools, this course is called "SLC Integrated Advanced Sciences")
 SLC Honors English I
 SLC Honors English II
 SLC Completion of Advanced English (In some schools, this course is called "SLC Honors English III")

Electives include:

 SLC Language Enrichment (French, Spanish, Japanese, Arabic, Chinese, Russian or German; depending on school)
 SLC Ethics and Philosophy
 SLC Theory of Knowledge (may not be available in most SLC schools; effective 2019)
 SLC Modern Technology
 SLC Computer Sciences
 SLC Arts
 SLC Music Theory
 SLC Design
 SLC Psychology
 SLC Reading and Writing Lab

Other courses:

 Bridge to SLC 
 This is a course for students in grade 8 admitted to SLC in the following year of high school. This prepares students in the structure of SLC with maths, humanities, sciences, and English with an advanced level of preparation. The class conjoins all courses spread in weeks.

See also
 Small schools movement

References

External links
Association for Career and Technical Education small learning community resources
Northwest Regional Educational Laboratory
Background and Structure of Career Clusters
U.S. Department of Education SLC Program
Career Academy Support Network
Institute for Research and Reform in Education
California League of Schools
National Educator Program

United States educational programs
Standards-based education
Curricula